is a satirical novel written in 1905–1906 by Natsume Sōseki about Japanese society during the Meiji period (1868–1912), particularly the uneasy mix of Western culture and Japanese traditions.

Sōseki's title, Wagahai wa Neko de Aru, uses a very high-register phrasing more appropriate to a nobleman, conveying grandiloquence and self-importance. This is somewhat ironic, since the speaker, an anthropomorphized domestic cat, is a regular house cat of a teacher, and not of a high-ranking noble as the manner of speech suggests, an example of Sōseki's love for droll writing.

The book was first published in ten installments in the literary journal Hototogisu. At first, Sōseki intended only to write the short story that constitutes the first chapter of I Am a Cat. However, Takahama Kyoshi, one of the editors of Hototogisu, persuaded Sōseki to serialize the work, which evolved stylistically as the installments progressed. Nearly all the chapters can stand alone as discrete works.

Plot summary

Cultural impact
I Am a Cat is a frequent assignment to Japanese schoolchildren, such that the plot and style remain well-known long after publication.  One effect was that the narrator's manner of speech, which was archaic  even at the time of writing, became largely associated with the cat and the book.  The narrator's preferred personal pronoun, wagahai, is rarely-to-never used in "real life" in Japan, but survives in fiction thanks to the book, generally for arrogant and pompous anthropomorphized animals.  For example, Bowser, the turtle-king enemy in many Mario series video games, uses wagahai, as does Morgana, a cat character in Persona 5.

Adaptations
The novel was first adapted into a film released in 1936. Later, prolific screenwriter Toshio Yasumi adapted the novel into a screenplay, and a second film was directed by Kon Ichikawa. It premiered in Japanese cinemas in 1975. An anime television special adaptation aired in 1982.

Footnotes

External links

  Full text (Kyūjitai and Historical kana orthography) at Aozora Bunko
  Full text (Shinjitai and Modern kana usage) at Aozora Bunko
  I Am a Cat at natsumesoseki.com
 (in English, translated by Kan-ichi Ando, 1906) (pdf) I Am a Cat, Chapter I & Chapter II (English, 1906)
  (excerpt)
 Soseki Project  (resources for reading Sōseki's works in their original Japanese form)

 Adaptations

 
 
 
 
 
 Wagahai wa Neko de Aru (1982) at allcinema 

1906 novels
Japanese comedy novels
Novels about cats
Fiction with unreliable narrators
Japanese novels adapted into films
Novels by Natsume Sōseki
Novels set in Japan
Japanese satirical novels
Tuttle Publishing books
Books about cats